Abrar Ahmed was an Indian politician and member of the Indian National Congress who served as a Member of Rajya Sabha from 3 April 1988 to 2 April 1994 and Executive President of Rajasthan Pradesh Congress Committee.

Personal life 
He was born on 10 July 1956 in Baran, Rajasthan and married Yasmeen Khan on 20 March 1983. The couple had one son and one daughter including politician Danish Abrar. In 5 May 2004, he died in a car accident.

References 

Rajya Sabha members from Rajasthan